Björn Dahlem (born 1974) is an artist based in Potsdam.

Dahlem was born in Munich. He studied at the Kunstakademie Düsseldorf from 1994 to 2000. He makes sculptures based on space and astrophysics out of ordinary household materials.

Between 2005 and 2011, Dahlem was a guest professor Berlin University of the Arts (UdK), Nuremberg Academy of Fine Arts, Karlsruhe Academy of Fine Arts and Braunschweig University of Art. Since 2012, he has been a professor for sculpture at the Braunschweig University of Art.
Since 2017 ,he is a professor for sculpture and installation at the Bauhaus-University Weimar

Selected exhibitions
2000
German Handikraft (with John Bock and René Zeh), Artspace NZ, Auckland, New Zealand
2001
Neue Modelle, Trafo Gallery, Budapest
2002
Orgasmodrom, Galleria Giò Marconi, Milan
2003
Coma Sculptor, Friedrich Petzel Gallery, New York
2004
Kommando Pfannenkuchen, Daniel Hug Gallery, Los Angeles
Heimweh, Haunch of Venison, London
Solaris, UCLA Hammer Museum, Los Angeles
Lost in Werner, The Modern Institute, Glasgow
2005
Printemps de Septembre, Festival of Contemporary Images, Toulouse
S.N.O.W., Galerie Tucci Russo, Turin
Strange Attractor, Gallery Hiromi Yoshii, Tokyo
2006
Extension Turn 2, Eastlink Gallery, Shanghai
The Homunculus Saloon, Engholm Engelhorn Galerie, Vienna
Busan Biennale, Museum of Modern Art, Busan, South Korea
Berlin goes Zürich, Arndt & Partner, Zurich
2007
Gallery Swap (Galerie Guido W. Baudach, Berlin and Hotel, London),Hotel, London
The Milky Way, Galerie Guido W. Baudach, Berlin

References

External links
Bjorn Dahlem at Engholm Engelhorn
Johnson, Ken, Bjorn Dahlem: Coma Sculptor, New York Times
Bjorn Dahlem on ArtNet.com
Bjorn Dahlem on ArtFacts.net
Further information from the Saatchi Gallery
Björn Dahlem at Berliner Poster Verlag

Living people
1974 births
People from Potsdam
Artists from Berlin
German contemporary artists
Academic staff of the Braunschweig University of Art